Bukovets is a village (село) in northwestern Bulgaria, located in the Brusartsi Municipality of the Montana Province.

Gallery

References

Villages in Montana Province